Philip Nicholas Steele (born 17 May 1948) is an English author, chiefly of children's non-fiction.

Steele was born in Dorking, Surrey, England. He attended Felsted School and University College, Durham, graduating in Modern Languages in 1971. In the 1970s he worked as an editor for various book publishers in London, including Hodder and Hamlyn. In 1980 he moved to the Isle of Anglesey, in North Wales, where he now lives.

He has written on a wide range of topics, especially in the fields of history, junior biography, peoples and cultures. Many of his books are illustrated international co-editions, published in various languages, while others are aimed more specifically at the British market. Steele has also written adult books dealing with the history and landscape of North Wales.

References

External links
  Philip Steele's website

See also
  List of children's non-fiction writers

People educated at Felsted School
British non-fiction writers
British children's writers
Living people
1948 births
British male writers
Alumni of University College, Durham
Male non-fiction writers